The Rhin is a river of Schleswig-Holstein, Germany and a tributary of the Elbe, that's formed by the confluence of the Herzhorner Rhin and the Kremper Rhin in Glückstadt.

See also
List of rivers of Schleswig-Holstein

Rivers of Schleswig-Holstein
Rivers of Germany